Alexander McNeill was a Scottish footballer who played as an outside left in the early part of his career, and as a left half towards its end. He spent most of his playing days with Port Glasgow Athletic over two spells, winning the Scottish Division Two title in 1901–02 and playing his part in them retaining top-division status for the next four seasons. He also had short spells with St Bernard's and Abercorn.

McNeill was selected for the Scottish Football League XI on one occasion, a 6–0 win over the Irish League representative team in February 1900. He was the only serving Port Glasgow player to feature for the SFL XI.

He should not be confused with Daniel McNeill (possibly a relative) or Alexander Neil, both of whom played for Port Glasgow in the same era (Neil also played for Abercorn).

References

Year of birth unknown
1870s births
Year of death unknown
20th-century deaths
Scottish footballers
Association football outside forwards
Association football wing halves
Scottish Football League players
Scottish Football League representative players
Port Glasgow Athletic F.C. players
St Bernard's F.C. players
Abercorn F.C. players